The 1964 United States presidential election in Hawaii took place on November 7, 1964. All 50 states and the District of Columbia, were part of the 1964 United States presidential election. Hawaii voters chose 4 electors to the Electoral College, which selected the president and vice president of the United States.

Hawaii was won by incumbent United States President Lyndon B. Johnson of Texas, who was running against Senator Barry Goldwater of Arizona. Johnson ran for a second time with Senator Hubert Humphrey of Minnesota, and Goldwater ran with U.S. Representative William E. Miller of New York.

This would be the first of three times Hawaii was won by a Democratic presidential candidate with over 70% of the vote, the other two times being Barack Obama - a native of the state - in 2008 and 2012, although by around 7-8 points less than Johnson's victory.

Democratic victory

President Lyndon B. Johnson won the State of Hawaii by an absolute sweep-out landslide of 57.52 points. No presidential candidate has ever won a larger percentage of the vote in the state than Johnson.

Results

See also
 Presidency of Lyndon B. Johnson

References

Hawaii
1964
1964 Hawaii elections